Fingerprints of the Gods: The Evidence of Earth's Lost Civilization is a 1995 pseudoarcheology book by British writer Graham Hancock, which contends that an advanced civilization existed in prehistory, one which served as the common progenitor civilization to all subsequent known ancient historical ones. The author proposes that sometime around the end of the last ice age this civilization ended in cataclysm, but passed on to its inheritors profound knowledge of such things as astronomy, architecture and mathematics.

Hancock's views are based on the idea that mainstream interpretations of archaeological evidence are flawed or incomplete. His book has been compared to Ignatius Donnelly's Atlantis: The Antediluvian World (1882).

The book was followed by Magicians of the Gods.

Thesis

Hancock argues for a civilisation centered on Antarctica (which lay farther from the South Pole than today) that supposedly left evidence (the "fingerprints" of the title) in Ancient Egypt and American civilisations such as the Olmec, Aztec and Maya. 
Hancock discusses:
  creation myths describing deities like:
 Osiris, Thoth (Egypt)
 Quetzalcoatl (Mesoamerica)
 Viracocha (Andes)
 a range of archaeological sites such as Tiwanaku in Bolivia. Tiwanaku was a planned city which, according to UNESCO, reached its peak between 400 AD and 900 AD, but is assigned an earlier date by Hancock.  Tiwanaku is also featured in other works of "alternative archaeology", including Von Däniken's Chariots of the Gods?. Von Däniken suggested that it provides evidence of an extraterrestrial civilisation, whereas Hancock does not argue for "ancient astronauts"; he proposes Atlantis as the origin of a lost civilisation.

Hancock suggests that in 10,450 BC, a major pole shift took place. Before then, Antarctica lay farther from the South Pole than today, and after then, it shifted to its present location. The pole-shift hypothesis hinges on Charles Hapgood's theory of Earth Crustal Displacement. Hapgood had a fascination with the story of Atlantis and suggested that crustal displacement may have caused its destruction.  His theories have few supporters in the geological community compared to the more widely accepted model of plate tectonics, but they were adopted by Rand and Rose Flem-Ath's When the Sky Fell: in Search of Atlantis (1995/2009) in which they expand the evidence for Charles Hapgood's theory of earth-crust displacement and propose Antarctica as the site of Atlantis.

Reception
Members of the scholarly and scientific community have described the proposals put forward in the book as pseudoscience and pseudoarchaeology.

Canadian author Heather Pringle has placed Fingerprints specifically within a pseudo-scientific tradition going back through the writings of H.S. Bellamy and Denis Saurat to the work of Heinrich Himmler's notorious racial research institute, the Ahnenerbe, and the "crackpot theories" of Nazi archaeologist Edmund Kiss. Pringle draws attention to Fingerprints''' "wild speculations" on the origins of Tiwanaku and describes Hancock as a "fabulist".

To archeologist Kenneth Feder, the book reads like the "Victorian travelogue" of a writer untrained in archeology, who credits a mysterious white people for the achievements of the ancient civilizations he visits, Hancock notably referring to the Maya as "jungle-dwelling Indians" who couldn't possibly come up with a sophisticated calendar. Feder sees Hancock's synthesis of a variety of fringe writers such as Ignatius Donnelly, Charles Hapgood, Arthur Posnansky, Robert Bauval and Anthony West "very hard to swallow, indeed."Fingerprints of the Gods has been translated into 27 languages and is estimated to have sold five million copies around the world.

Hancock responded to some of his critics with an updated edition of the book published in 2001 with a new introduction and new appendices, Fingerprints of the Gods: The Quest Continues.

InfluenceFingerprints of the Gods was cited as an inspiration for the 2009 disaster film 2012. In a November 2009 interview with the London magazine Time Out, the film's director Roland Emmerich stated: "I always wanted to do a biblical flood movie, but I never felt I had the hook. I first read about the Earth's crust displacement theory in Graham Hancock's Fingerprints of the Gods."

In the extras of the Blu-ray 10,000 BC'', the director Emmerich and his co-writer Harald Kloser said that they had found inspiration in the same book.

References

Works cited

Further reading
 

 Comments on Hancock's views of geology presented in a series of articles.

1995 non-fiction books
Books by Graham Hancock
Catastrophism
English-language books
Pseudoarchaeological texts
Prehistory of Antarctica
Crown Publishing Group books